VegNews is an American magazine that publishes content about and relating to veganism, including news, health information, recipes, global events, vegan products, media, and more.

History and profile
It was founded in 2000 as a newspaper, and transitioned to full-color glossy magazine in 2004. The magazine is published on a quarterly basis. VegNews is owned by Fresh Healthy Media, LLC, a company devoted to promoting the vegan lifestyle which is owned and operated by VegNews’ co-founder and publisher Colleen Holland. Joe Connelly is the other co-founder.

VegNews won an award for Best Lifestyle Magazine in 2017.

VegNews is published in Los Angeles, California.

See also 
 List of vegan media

References

External links
 Audio recording of founders interview
 Interview with founders

Bimonthly magazines published in the United States
Lifestyle magazines published in the United States
Food and drink magazines
Magazines established in 2004
Magazines published in Los Angeles
Newspapers established in 2000
Vegetarian publications and websites
Veganism in the United States